The Wendessi tree frog (Litoria longicrus) is a species of frog in the subfamily Pelodryadinae.

It is found in New Guinea.

Its natural habitats are subtropical or tropical moist lowland forests and rivers.

Description 
It has finger disks as large as the eardrum; toes almost entirely webbed on outer half of toes; very weak sub-articular tubercles. From snout to cloaca is 33 mm.

Dorsal surface smooth or finely bordered; belly and base of lower surface of thighs granulated; smooth throat; no chest crease. Coloration is green above; sides, upper surface of thighs and hands and feet are colorless, with green dots or lattices; there is a white stripe below the eye to the corner of the mouth, with a white throat and belly.

Taxonomy 
Litoria longicrus is part of the species-group L. bicolor, which was created to accommodate 7 species from the region that had characteristics in common.

The other members of the group are: Litoria cooloolensis and Litoria fallax in Australia; Litoria bicolor in Austrália and Papua New Guine; Litoria bibonius, Litoria contrastens and Litoria mystax in Papua New Guine.

References

Litoria
Amphibians of New Guinea
Taxonomy articles created by Polbot
Amphibians described in 1911